Air Panama flies to nineteen airports regularly (most of them in Panama with one in Costa Rica and three in Colombia with regular service), with twenty-four more destinations served on a chartered on-demand basis during the summer traveling season.

List

References

Air Panama